Lou! is a French comic book series and animated television series created by Julien Neel. The comic is published by Glénat and the animated series is broadcast in France on M6 and Disney Channel. The series combines elements of farce and romantic comedy aimed at children while giving adult readers witty critiques of psychobabble and how mobile phones are changing social 'rules'. The main comic's first "season" came to an end in 2018 after eight volumes, although a prequel series titled Le petit monde de Lou was released in 2019, with the second "season" titled Lou! Sonata beginning with the ninth volume in 2020.

Characters

Lou- The title character, a twelve-year-old blond girl (by the eight comic volume she is eighteen) who is lively, funny, creative and independent - but also frustrated that she is shorter than most of her peers. She lives with her mother in an apartment, in the fifth volume they move to a new house after the apartment building burns down. Her best friend is Mina, and she has a crush on her neighbor, Tristan. She also owns a nameless cat. A recurring theme is the inversion of the mother-daughter relationship where the daughter acts more mature than her mother.
Lou's Mother - A woman about 30 years old and the single mother of Lou. She appears to have her eyes always hidden under her hair and wears large glasses. In her adolescence she was rebellious and troublesome and fell in love with a rock musician. The rock musician leaves her when he learns that she is pregnant and she ends up raising her daughter, Lou, on her own. She managed to finished her studies and becomes the author of a science fiction novel called Sidera: The Space Wanderer which achieved moderate success. Lou's mother is a fan of video games and the band Queen. Thanks to Lou, she starts a relationship with her new neighbor Richard, and in the fifth volume she is pregnant again, with Richard being the father. However, Richard leaves her because of an apparent nervous breakdown over how to raise the new baby. In the end, the baby is born and is named Fulgor, becoming Lou's little half-brother.
Mina- A black girl who is Lou's best friend since kindergarten. She has a strong and slightly aggressive attitude, so it is not uncommon for her and Lou to argue, but they always make up in the end. Her parents divorce in the first volume, and she lives with her mother, who works as an executive, on a higher class apartment.
Tristan- A boy with brown hair, who was Lou's neighbor during the first volume (at the end he moves to another city), and is also her secret crush since kindergarten. Tristan seems oblivious to this, but they are hints that he may also have feelings for her. On the fifth volume, he invites Lou to spend some days on his uncle's winter cottage, where they share their first kiss, likely signaling the start of a formal relationship. However, he does not appear in the sixth volume, where it is hinted that he and Lou have broken up. He likes to practice the acoustic guitar, and is also a fan of video games, sharing this hobby with Lou's mother.
Richard- Lou's neighbor, who moved to their building in the first volume, being of a small village named Super Chevelle. Thanks to Lou, he and Lou's mother begin a relationship, but separate during the fifth volume and he does not appear in the sixth. He works at a record store, and was formerly a curling player.
Cat- Lou's pet cat (unclear if it is male or female), with the characteristic of not having an official name, being differently named often by Lou or her mother. Its names include: Mongo-Elvis, Super Satori, Chachoomoo, Hulk, Thinny, etc. It's grey and small.
Grandmother- Lou's grandmother and Emma's mother. She is always grumpy and complains about everything. She is a very bitter person but she has a heart. she likes cauliflower and watches the show "glamour" every day even though she claims to think it's stupid.
Paul- A guy Lou meets while visiting her grandmother. At first she thought he was a creep, but as it turned out he was pretty cool. He likes Hawaii and paints Hawaii-themed paintings and writes songs.

Comic
 Volume 1: Journal infime (2004)  [English (1) EU: Diary Dates 978-1905496105 (2) World incl. USA: Secret Diary 978-0761388685]
 Volume 2: Mortebouse (2005)  [English Summmertime Blues (1) EU: 978-1905496112 (2) World incl. USA: 978-0761388692]
 Volume 3: Le cimetière des autobus (2006)  [English Down in the Dumps (1) EU: 978-1905496129 (2) World incl. USA: 978-0822591658]
 Volume 4: Idylls (2007)  [English (1) EU: Romances 978-1905496136 (2) World incl. USA: The Perfect Summer 978-0822591696]
 Volume 5: Laser Ninja (2009)  [English EU: ]
 Volume 6: L'Age de Cristal (2012) 
 Volume 7: La cabane (2016) 
 Volume 8: En route vers de nouvelles aventures (2018) 
 Volume 9: Premier mouvement (2020)

Reception
Volume 1, Journal infime, received the Youth Award for ages 9 to 12 at the Angoulême Festival in 2005. Volume 5, Laser Ninja, won the award for best youth comic at the Angoulême Festival in 2010.

Animation
The first comic volume, Journal infime, was adapted into 52 12-minute episodes. The series was produced by GO-N Productions in association with M6 television and Disney Channel France, directed by Jérôme Mouscadet, character design adaptation by David Gilson, screenplay by Jean-Rémi François and Anna Fregonese. The series premiered in France on April 5, 2009 on M6, and then later on the French version of Disney Channel, also dubbed in Spanish by Colombian voice actors and broadcast on Mexico's Canal Once from November 2009 until September 2010. It has recently been dubbed into English with UK-based voice actors, and more English episodes are currently being uploaded.

Live-action movie 

A live-action film adaptation based on the comic was released in France on October 8, 2014.

References

External links
 French Wikipedia

French comics titles
French comics adapted into films
Comics adapted into animated series
Comics adapted into television series